San José de Apalta is a village located in the Chilean commune of Santa Cruz, Colchagua province.

References 

Populated places in Colchagua Province